Francisco Miguel Meireles Von Doellinger Castro (born 3 June 1979 in Fafe, Braga District) is a Portuguese retired footballer who played as a midfielder.

References

External links

1979 births
Living people
People from Fafe
Portuguese footballers
Association football midfielders
Primeira Liga players
Liga Portugal 2 players
Segunda Divisão players
AD Fafe players
Moreirense F.C. players
C.F. Estrela da Amadora players
F.C. Maia players
C.D. Aves players
Gondomar S.C. players
Sportspeople from Braga District

simple:Francisco Castro